Events from the year 1953 in Sweden

Incumbents
 Monarch – Gustaf VI Adolf 
 Prime Minister – Tage Erlander

Events
8 September – The first motorway in Sweden is inaugurated, and runs between Malmö and Lund.

Births
 27 January – Göran Flodström, fencer.
 18 April – Bernt Johansson, cyclist.

Exact date unknown

 Eva Runefelt, novelist.
 Niklas Rådström, poet.

Deaths
 3 April – Algot Lönn, cyclist (born 1887).
 22 May – Hanna Grönvall, politician and trade union worker (born 1879)
 5 August – Sven Johansson, canoer (born 1912).
 7 August – Anna Johansson-Visborg, politician (Social Democrat), trade unionist and women's right activist (born 1876)
 Amanda Horney, politician (Social Democrat), trade unionist and women's right activist (born 1857)

References

 
Sweden
Years of the 20th century in Sweden